The 1965–66 Scottish Division One was won by Celtic by two points over city rivals Rangers. Morton and Hamilton Academical finished 17th and 18th respectively and were relegated to the 1966-67 Second Division.

League table

Results

See also
Nine in a row

References

1
Scottish Division One seasons
Scot